The 2018 Ole Miss Rebels baseball team represented the University of Mississippi in the 2018 NCAA Division I baseball season. The Rebels played their home games at Swayze Field.

Personnel

Coaching staff

Schedule and results

Schedule Source:

Record vs. conference opponents

References

Ole Miss
Ole Miss Rebels baseball seasons
Ole Miss baseball
2018 NCAA Division I baseball tournament participants
Southeastern Conference baseball champion seasons